Margibi is a county on the north to central coast of Liberia. One of 15 counties that constitute the first-level of administrative division in the nation, it has five districts. As of the 2008 Census, it had a population of 199,689, making it the sixth most populous county in Liberia.

Margibi's County Superintendent is John Zubah Buway. The county is bordered by Montserrado County to the west, Grand Bassa County to the east, and Bong County on the north. The southern part of Margibi lies on the Atlantic Ocean.

Geography
It is swampy along rivers and creeks, while there are patches of Savannah woodland. Rice and cassava interplanted with Sugarcane are the major crops grown in the region. The regions receive a bimodal rainfall with a gap of two weeks in between. Cocoa, coffee, rubber, citrus oil and palm are the most common crops in the region.

Demographics
As of 2008, the county had a population of 209,923: 105,840 male and 104,083 female. The sex ratio was 101.7 compared to 100.9 in 1994 census. The number of households during 2008 was 19,254 and the average size of the households was 4.6. The population was 7.20 per cent of the total population, while it was 6.00 per cent in 1994. The county had an area of 1,039 sq mi and the density per sq.mi was 202. The density during the 1984 census stood at 146. Liberia experienced civil war during various times and the total number of people displaced on account of wars as of 2008 in the county was 46,663. The number of people residing in urban areas was 88,868, with 43,723 males and 45,145 females. The total number of people in rural areas was 121,055, with 62,117 males and 58,938 females. The total fraction of people residing in urban areas was 42.33 per cent, while the remaining 058 per cent were living in rural areas. The number of people resettled as of 2008 was 29,813 while the number of people who were not resettled was 1,754. The number of literates above the age of ten as of 2008 was 55,994 while the number of illiterates was 39,112 making the literacy rate to 58.88. The total number of literate males was 33,596 while the total number of literate females was 22,398. Around 90% of the county's population are Christians, 5% are Muslims, and  5% is Animist.

History
Margibi County is one of the latest set of counties created in 1985 by an Interim National Assembly decree dated December 13, 1985. During the Civil war, the county is the one of the largest to have maximum displacements. An estimated 200,000 people were displaced in the county between Konala and Kakata. The county was created by merging the territories of Marshall and Gibi. The county was traditionally inhabited by Bassa tribe. The Kpelle, a southwestern Mende speaking people are another tribe along with the Bassa, who also have their historic homelands in the region.

Economy

The total production stood at 7000 metric tonnes. As of 2011, the number of Cassava plantation was 6070, which was 5 per cent of the total area of Cassava planted in the country. The total production stood at 760 metric tonnes. The number of Cocoa plantation was 760, which was 2 per cent of the total area of Cassava planted in the country. The number of rubber plantation was 3680, which was 5.9 per cent of the total area of Cassava planted in the country. The number of Coffee plantation was 340, which was 1.5 per cent of the total area of Cassava planted in the country. As of 2008, the county had 14,872 paid employees, 27,567 self-employed people, 19,298 family workers, 7,048 people looking for work, 9,193 not working people, 23,012 people working in households, 40,953 students, 1,330 retired people, 2,789 incapacitated people, 3,227 part-time workers  and 20,954 others, making the total working population of 170,243.

Administration
Districts of Margibi County include (2008 population):Firestone District (57,251), Gibi District (13,232), Kakata District (88,130) and Mambah-Kaba District (41,076) The Legislature of Liberia was modeled based on the Legislature of United States. It is bicameral in nature with a Senate and the House of Representatives. There are 13 counties in the country and based on the population, each county is defined to have at least two members, while the total number of members to the house including the Speaker being 64. Each member represents an electoral district and elected to a six-year term based on popular vote. There were 26 senators, two each for the 13 counties and they serve a nine-year term (30 senators, 15 counties and nine years from 2011). Senators are also elected based on plurality of votes. The vice-president is the head of the Senate and he also acts as president in his absence.

Notes

References

External links
National Transitional Government of Liberia: Margibi County
County Development Agenda
Place name codes

 
Counties of Liberia
1985 establishments in Liberia
States and territories established in 1985